Mukhmas, in the Spanish transcriptions Mujmas, is a Palestinian village in the Jerusalem Governorate, located northeast of Jerusalem, in the center of the West Bank. According to the Palestinian Central Bureau of Statistics, the town had a population of 1,878 in 2006.

Location
It is bordered by Deir Dibwan to the north, Burqa to the west, and Jaba' to the south. The Israeli settlement Ma'ale Mikhmas lies to the east.

History

Mukhmas is identified with the ancient town of Michmas, and the modern Arabic name preserves the ancient Hebrew name. Its ruins can be found at Khirbet el-Hara el-Fauqa, an archaeological site at the northern edge of the village.

Four clusters of tombs including as many as 70 burial caves dating from the Second Temple period were discovered in Mukhmas during the 1980s. On the entrance to one of the caves, a drawing of a seven-branched menorah was found, alongside an inscription written in the Paleo-Hebrew script. Other findings from Mukhmas include an ossuary which bears the name ‘Shimeon L[evi]’ in the Hebrew alphabet. These findings led archeologists to believe that Mukhmas was a Jewish priestly settlement which was populated up until Bar-Kokhba revolt in the early 2nd century CE.

Byzantine period 
Ceramics from the Byzantine era have been found in Mukhmas. Clermont-Ganneau also found Byzantine remains here, speculating that they might be from the convent found by abbot Firminus, a disciple of St. Sabas.The SWP noted about Mikhmas: "In the village are remains of old masonry, apparendy a church. A pillar-shaft is built into a wall in the north-west corner of the village. Two lintel stones are built over the door of another house, one with three crosses in circles, the second with a design apparently cut in half."

Ottoman era
Mukhmas was incorporated into the Ottoman Empire in 1517 with all of Palestine, and in 1596 it appeared in the tax registers as being in the nahiya of Al-Quds in the liwa of Al-Quds under the name of Mihmas. It had a population of 24 household; who were all Muslims. They paid a fixed Ziamet tax-rate of 33.3% on agricultural products, including wheat, barley, olive trees, fruit trees, goats and beehives, in addition to occasional revenues; a total of 2,200 akçe.

In 1838, it was noted as a Muslim village, Mukhmas, located in the area immediately north of Jerusalem. 

In 1863, Victor Guérin observed a great number of sizeable antique stones in the modern houses. About thirty cisterns and silos dug in the rock also dated back to antiquity. An Ottoman village list of about 1870 showed that Muchmas had 36 houses and a population of 120, though the population count included only men. 

In 1883 the PEF's Survey of Western Palestine (SWP) described Mukhmas as: "A small stone village on the slope of a ridge. The houses are poor and scattered. The water supply is from cisterns. It has a well to the east, and some scattered figs to the west. On the north are rock-cut tombs; an ancient road leads past the place. There are foundations and remains of former buildings in the village; on the south a steep slope leads clown to the great valley, Wady Suweinit. This place is the ancient Michmash, which is placed by the Onomasticon 9 Roman miles from  Jerusalem. The distance is 7 1/2 English or 8 Roman miles in a line."

In 1896 the population of Muchmas was estimated to be about 288 persons.

British Mandate era
In the 1922 census of Palestine conducted by the British Mandate authorities, Mukhmas had a population of 361, increasing in the 1931 census to 404 inhabitants, in 80 houses.

In the 1945 statistics, Mukhmas had a population of 540 Muslims, and a land area of 13,479 dunams. Of this, 569 dunams were designated for plantations and irrigable land, 2,274 for cereals, while 28 dunams were built-up (urban) land.

Jordanian era
In the wake of the 1948 Arab–Israeli War, and after the 1949 Armistice Agreements, Mukhmas came under Jordanian rule.

The Jordanian census of 1961 found 774 inhabitants.

Post 1967
After the Six-Day War in 1967, Mukhmas has been under Israeli occupation. After the 1995 accords, 6.4% of the village land was classified as Area B, the remaining 93.6% as Area C.

The Israelis have confiscated land in Mukhmas for its military bases, roads, and Israeli settlements, including Sha'ar Binyamin and Ma'ale Mikhmas. In 2010, Israeli Settlers from Ofra and Migron uprooted several hundred olive trees owned by the people of Mukhmas.

In 2011, Israeli settlers from the nearby settlement of Ma'ale Mikhmas set fire to about a hundred olive trees belonging to the people of Mukhmas.

References

Bibliography

External links
Mukhmas USA - A place to find families and events with Mukhmas people
 Welcome to Mikhmas
Survey of Western Palestine, Map 17:    IAA, Wikimedia commons 
  Mukhmas village (fact sheet),  Applied Research Institute–Jerusalem (ARIJ)
  Mikhmas village profile, ARIJ
 Mikhmas aerial photo, ARIJ
  Locality Development Priorities and Needs in Mukhmas, ARIJ

Villages in the West Bank
Jerusalem Governorate
Municipalities of the State of Palestine